Pakarkliai (formerly) is a village in Kėdainiai district municipality, in Kaunas County, in central Lithuania. According to the 2011 census, the village had a population of 67 people. There are warehouses and technical areas of the Krakės Agriculture Cooperative.

History
Pakarkliai is known since 1590.

Demography

Images

References

Villages in Kaunas County
Kėdainiai District Municipality